Barbara Sellers-Young is the former Dean of the School of Arts, Media, Performance, and Design  of York University. She has applied the somatic marker hypothesis to dance performance in numerous articles and lectures, and is the author or editor of seven books on dance theory including The Oxford Handbook of Dance and Ethnicity and Belly Dance. Her investigation on the intersectionality of dance and culture within a multicultural world has included research in numerous countries.. She is on the editorial board for the Dance Chronicle, and is a member of the advisory council for the School of Music and Dance at the University of Oregon.

Notable works
The Oxford Handbook of Dance and Ethnicity and Belly Dance, Oxford University Press (co-editor) 2016, 
Belly Dance, Pilgrimage and Identity, Palgrave Macmillan 2016,

References

Academics of the University of York
Dance research
Living people
Year of birth missing (living people)
Place of birth missing (living people)